Magens Bay is a bay in the Northside region on Saint Thomas, United States Virgin Islands, in the Caribbean.

Description
Lying on the northern (Atlantic) side of the island, Magens Bay (Estate Zufriedenheit) features a well-protected white sand beach stretching for nearly three quarters of a mile.  It is one of the most popular tourist destinations on the island, as well as a gathering place for locals. The beach sits at the head of a deep bay, the arms of which are Peterborg peninsula to the east and Tropaco Point to the west.  The bay's north-west exposure means its waters are usually calm, although storms in the North Atlantic can occasionally generate large waves in the winter months.  The sandy bottom means snorkeling is of limited interest, although turtles, conch, tarpon and other fish are commonly spotted.  Local fishing boats anchor in the eastern part of the bay.

The beach and surrounding park are currently administered by the semi-autonomous Magens Bay Authority.  The services provided by the Authority include lifeguards, parking, showers and bathrooms.  There is a snack counter, bar and souvenir shop.  Beach chairs, floats, lounge chairs, mask and snorkels, fins, towels, lockers, paddleboards, kayaks, and paddleboats can be rented. The Authority is a self-sustaining entity which funds its operations through a per-person entrance fee (currently $5.00 for visitors and $2.00 for locals, free for kids under 12), parking fees, and payments received from the park's restaurant and rental concessions. The beach property also includes a coconut grove, a mangrove, and an arboretum.

Environment

Nature Trail
In 2004, The Nature Conservancy and local organizations opened a trail to Magens Bay from a spot off the road in the hills above. It belongs to a 319 acre preserve overseen by The Nature Conservancy, Magens Bay Authority and VI Department of Planning & Nature Resources. 25 of its acres were exclusively donated for this trail. On the trail it is possible to see many different bird species of the preserve, passing though different ecosystems from the top of the hill down 1½ miles to Magens Bay.

Important Bird Area
A 572 ha area, encompassing the bay, beach, mangroves and associated protected forests, has been recognised as an Important Bird Area (IBA) by BirdLife International because it supports populations of green-throated caribs, Antillean crested hummingbirds, Caribbean elaenias and pearly-eyed thrashers.

History
Legend has it that Sir Francis Drake used Magens Bay as an anchorage while waiting for ships to plunder.

Early maps of St. Thomas refer to the site as "Great Northside Bay". The popular name, "Magens Bay", arose out of its ownership by vicegouvernor Jacob Jorgenson Magens (1682-1731) and his heirs from the late 18th through the 19th centuries. It changed hands in the 20th century, and was eventually acquired by Wall Street financier Arthur S. Fairchild. 
Arthur Fairchild donated 56 acres of the beach and surrounding areas to the Municipality of St. Thomas and St. John in 1946 for use as a public park.  The far Western portion was donated by Fairchild's nephew's widow, Christine Wheaton, in 2002.

In popular culture
Several commercials and movie scenes have been filmed at Magens Bay, including a scene in The Twilight Saga: Breaking Dawn – Part 1.

Gallery

References

External links

Magens Bay Photo Gallery

Beaches of the United States Virgin Islands
Bays of the United States Virgin Islands
Important Bird Areas of the United States Virgin Islands
Landforms of Saint Thomas, U.S. Virgin Islands
Northside, Saint Thomas, U.S. Virgin Islands